Huney is an uninhabited island due east of the island of Unst in the Shetland Islands, Scotland. The island is located approximately 1 kilometre south west of Balta and has an area of just under . Huney is separated from Unst by a narrow channel called The Yei. At extremely low tides  a sandy tombolo may connect Huney to Unst.

The World War I British E-class submarine  was sunk in the channel between Huney and Balta with the loss of 3 officers and 28 ratings on 12 March 1917. The submarine was heading out of Balta Sound on patrol when it struck a naval mine probably lain by German U-boat . The wreck is now a designated war grave.

References 

Tidal islands of Scotland
Uninhabited islands of Shetland
Tombolos